Elia Elia (born 22 January 1996) is a Samoan rugby union player. His usual position is hooker and, since 2016, he has played for Harlequins. 

Elia played most of his rugby in Christchurch, New Zealand. In 2013, he was selected for the Condor Sevens and, in 2014, the under-19 team, which he captained in 2015. In 2016, he was selected for Manu Samoa.

In 2016, he signed a contract with Harlequins. His contract was extended in 2017, and again in 2019.

In October 2020, he was banned for three matches for dangerous tackling.

He left Harlequins in 2021.

References

External links

1996 births
Living people
Samoan rugby union players
Samoa international rugby union players
Rugby union hookers
Harlequin F.C. players
Expatriate rugby union players in England
Union Sportive Bressane players